Meråkerposten (The Meråker Gazette) is a Norwegian local newspaper published in Meråker in Nord-Trøndelag county.

Meråkerposten is published weekly, appearing on Thursdays. The newspaper was established in 1982. It is edited by Knut Johansen.

Circulation
According to the Norwegian Audit Bureau of Circulations and National Association of Local Newspapers, Meråkerposten has had the following annual circulation:
2004: 1,225
2005: 1,115
2006: 1,131
2007: 1,199
2008: 1,357
2009: 1,279
2010: 1,238
2011: 1,201
2012: 1,094
2013: 1,103
2014: 1,067
2015: 1,040
2016: 1,005

References

Newspapers published in Norway
Norwegian-language newspapers
Meråker
Mass media in Trøndelag
Publications established in 1982
1982 establishments in Norway